This is a list of schools and institutions providing Scottish Gaelic–medium education (GME) by area. For convenience the areas listed are not necessarily council or education authority areas unless otherwise noted. There are at least 46 nurseries, 62 primary schools and 29 secondary schools providing GME education in Scotland.

Aberdeen City

Primary schools
Gilcomstoun Primary School – Provides nursery and primary school GME.

Secondary schools
Hazlehead Academy – only provides education in the subject of Gaelic, not Gaelic-medium education in other subjects

Angus

Whitehills Primary School, Forfar

Argyll and Bute

Primary schools
Bowmore Primary School, Islay
Tiree Primary School, Tiree
Salen Primary School, Mull
Rockfield Primary School, Oban
Strath of Appin Primary School, by Oban
Sandbank Primary School, Dunoon
Bunessan Primary - Isle of Mull

Secondary schools

Tiree Secondary School
Tobermory High School, Mull
Oban High School, Oban

Ayrshire

Primary schools

Sgoil na Coille Nuaidh, Kilmarnock – provides early learning and childcare, primary and secondary education for pupils aged 2–18 across East Ayrshire.
Bun-Sgoil Pàirc Whitehirst, Kilwinning – provides GME primary education for pupils aged 5–11 across North Ayrshire. The school opened in August 2020.

Secondary schools

Kilmarnock Academy , Kilmarnock – provides early learning and childcare, primary and secondary education for pupils aged 2–18 across East Ayrshire.

Clackmannanshire

No Gaelic-medium education exists in Clackmannanshire at present.

Comhairle nan Eilean Siar (Western Isles Council)

Gaelic-medium education is available in most, if not all schools in the Western Isles. There are currently 20 pre-schools, 18 primary schools and 4 secondary schools offering Gaelic-medium education.

East Dunbartonshire

Meadowburn Primary School

East Renfrewshire

No Gaelic-medium education exists in East Renfrewshire at present.

Edinburgh and East Lothian

Bun-sgoil Taobh na Pàirce
James Gillespie's High School

Falkirk

No Gaelic-medium education exists in Falkirk at present. Falkirk children attend the GME schools in North Lanarkshire and Stirling in transport provided by Falkirk Council.

Glasgow City

Sgoil Ghàidhlig Ghlaschu – provides primary and secondary education.
Bunsgoil Ghàidhlig Ghleann Dail
Bun-sgoil Ghàidhlig Baile Ghobhainn – provides GME primary education.

Highland

In the Highland council area there are 21 nurseries, 21 primary schools and 13 secondary schools educating 1294 pupils in Gaelic.

School areas with primaries providing GME
Acharacle, Lochaber
Bonar Bridge, Sutherland
Broadford, Isle of Skye
Bun-sgoil Ghàidhlig Inbhir Nis
Craighill, Tain
Dingwall, Ross-shire
Dunvegan, Isle of Skye
Fort William, Lochaber
Gairloch, Wester Ross
Glenurquhart
Kilmuir, Isle of Skye
Lochcarron
Mallaig, Lochaber
Millbank, Nairn
Newtonmore
Plockton
Portree, Isle of Skye
Sleat, Isle of Skye
Staffin, Isle of Skye
Mount Pleasant, Thurso, Caithness
Tongue, Sutherland
Ullapool

Secondary schools
Alness Academy
Ardnamurchan High
Charleston Academy
Culloden Academy
Dingwall Academy
Farr High
Gairloch High School
Inverness Royal Academy
Lochaber High School
Mallaig High School
Millburn Academy
Plockton High School
Portree High School
Ullapool High
Tain Royal Academy

Inverclyde

Whinhill Primary School (Bun-sgoil Chnoc a' Chonaisg), Greenock. (Includes Gaelic pre-school provision)

North Lanarkshire

Condorrat Primary School (Bunsgoil Chondobhrait), Cumbernauld provides Primary GME. The unit had roll of 166 in 2012/13
Greenfaulds High School, Cumbernauld provides Secondary GME.

Perth & Kinross
 Goodlyburn Primary School, Perth.  Provides Primary GME.
 Perth Academy, Perth.
 Breadalbane Academy, Aberfeldy. Provides Primary GME.

Renfrewshire

West Primary School, Paisley.

Scottish Borders

No Gaelic-medium education exists in the Scottish Borders at present.

South Lanarkshire

 Mount Cameron Primary School (with nursery)
 Calderglen High School

Stirling

Riverside Primary School, Stirling, provides Primary GME.
Wallace High School, Stirling, provides Secondary GME.

West Lothian
No Gaelic-medium education exists in West Lothian at present.

See also
 Scottish Gaelic–medium education
 Gaelscoil for Irish Gaelic–medium education in Ireland.

References

Minority schools
Gaelic-medium
Scottish Gaelic education